P5 may refer to:

In science and technology 
 311P/PANSTARRS, also known as P/2013 P5 (PANSTARRS), an asteroid discovered by the Pan-STARRS telescope on 27 August 2013
 P5 Truss Segment, an element of the International Space Station
 Period 5 of the periodic table of elements
 Styx (moon), the fifth moon of the dwarf planet Pluto
 Particle Physics Project Prioritization Panel, a scientific funding advisory group in the United States

Vehicles 

 P-5 Hawk, a 1923 aircraft
 Martin P5M Marlin, a flying boat
 Rover P5 (commonly called 3-Litre and 3½ Litre), a group of automobiles produced from 1958–1973
 Palatine P 5, a 1908 locomotive
 PRR P5, mixed-traffic electric locomotives constructed 1931–1935
 Protegé5, a 5-door sport-wagon produced by Mazda from 2002–2003
 Polikarpov P-5, Soviet passenger aircraft, modification of the R-5

In computing 

 P5 Glove, an input device for human-computer interaction
 P5 (microarchitecture), a fifth-generation central processing unit introduced in 1993
 System p5, a family of servers and workstations created by IBM in 2005
 p5.js is the JavaScript port of Processing
 Perl, version 5

Weapons 

 P-5 Pyatyorka, a 1959 anti-shipping missile of the Soviet Union
 Walther P5, a pistol made by German arms maker Walther in the 1970s

In arts and entertainment 
 P5 (comics), a comic strip also known as Class Act, in the UK comic The Dandy
 Persona 5, a 2016 video game from Atlus

In music 
 Perfect fifth, a music interval
 Pizzicato Five, a Shibuya-kei group

Other uses 
 Copa Airlines Colombia (formerly AeroRepublica), IATA airline code P5
 The five permanent members of the United Nations Security Council
 P5+1, the five permanent members of the UN Security Council plus Germany
 Norrbotten Armoured Battalion, designated P 5, a Swedish Army armored battalion active since 1957
 Power Five conferences, in American college football